Carraretto is a surname. Notable people with the surname include:

Marco Carraretto (born 1977), Italian basketball player
Renata Carraretto (1923–2000), Italian alpine skier

Italian-language surnames